Sir Albert Raymond Maillard Carr  (11 April 1919 – 19 April 2015) was an English historian specialising in the history of Spain, Latin America, and Sweden. From 1968 to 1987, he was Warden of St Antony's College, Oxford.

Early life
Carr was born on 11 April 1919 in Bath, Somerset, to Reginald Henry Maillard Carr and his wife (Ethel Gertrude) Marion (née Graham). He was educated at Brockenhurst School, then a state secondary school in the New Forest, Hampshire. He then studied at Christ Church, Oxford, where he was elected Gladstone Research Exhibitioner in 1941.<ref name=ww>CARR, Sir (Albert) Raymond (Maillard) at Who's Who online (accessed 11 January 2008)</ref>

Career
Carr was briefly a lecturer at University College, London, in 1945–1946, before returning to Oxford as a Fellow of All Souls College, 1946–1953. He was next a Fellow of New College, 1953–1964, then Director of Oxford's Latin American Centre, 1964–1968 and the University's Professor of the History of Latin America, 1967–68.

He became a Fellow of St Antony's College, Oxford, in 1964, Sub-Warden of the college in 1966 and Warden in 1968, a position he held until his retirement in 1987. After his retirement from Oxford, he was King Juan Carlos Professor of Spanish History at New York University in 1992.

Carr's successor as Warden of St Antony's, Ralf Dahrendorf, has described Carr's tenure of the post as the college's 'Fiesta days'.

As a historian and Hispanist, Carr's main interest lay in the vicissitudes of 19th and 20th century Spain, and he was also a specialist in Latin American and Swedish history. In the words of Sir John Elliott, " his book on Spain between 1808 and 1939 is basic to a better understanding of the era, and the later generation of historians, both within Spain and abroad, have followed up the leads that Carr gives in his book to great benefit."

His Modern Spain, 1875-1980 was called by the Times Literary Supplement "a turning point in Spanish historiography - nothing comparable in scope, profundity, or perceptiveness exists."

At St Antony's, he established an Iberian Centre, of which he was co-director with Joaquin Romero Maura. Paul Preston wrote in 1984 of their collaboration "Between them, Carr and Romero Maura instilled an intellectual rigour into modern Spanish historiography which had previously been conspicuously lacking." Carr also wrote an extensive foreword to the 1993 edition of The Spanish Labyrinth by Gerald Brenan.

A Fellow of the British Academy since 1978, in 1983 he was awarded the Order of Alfonso X el Sabio by King Juan Carlos of Spain and in 1999 the Prince of Asturias Award for Social Sciences.

He is considered, together with Angus Mackay and Sir John Huxtable Elliott, a major figure in developing Spanish historiography.

Carr wrote for The Spectator in 2007 - "I am old-fashioned and aged enough to believe that the best history is the work of the lone individual."

His recreation was fox hunting, about which he has written two books, English Fox Hunting: A History (1976), a comprehensive history of fox-hunting from medieval times, and, with his wife Sara Carr, Fox-Hunting (1982).

Other appointments
Member of the National Theatre Board, 1968–1977
Chairman of the Society for Latin American Studies, 1966–1968
Corresponding Member of the Spain's Royal Academy of History (Real Academia de la Historia), Madrid

Personal life and death
In 1950, Carr married Sara Ann Mary Strickland, daughter of Algernon Walter Strickland and of Lady Mary Pamela Madeline Sibell Charteris. Sara Strickland's maternal grandfather was Hugo Charteris, 11th Earl of Wemyss, and one of her great-grandfathers was Percy Wyndham (1835–1911), a Conservative politician who was one of The Souls. The Carrs have three sons and one daughter, Adam Henry Maillard Carr (born 1951), Matthew Xavier Maillard Carr (1953-2011), Laura Selina Madeline Carr (born 1954), and Alexander Rallion Charles Carr (born 1958). Their son Adam married Angela P. Barry in 1988, and their daughter Rose Angelica Mary Carr was born in 1991. Matthew, a portrait artist, married Lady Anne Mary Somerset in 1988, and their daughter Eleanor Carr was born in 1992. Laura Carr married Richard E. Barrowclough in 1978 and has four children, Milo Edmond, Conrad Oliver, Theodore Charles, and Sibell Augusta.

Carr died on 19 April 2015 at the age of 96."Muere el historiador británico Raymond Carr." El País. Retrieved 21 April 2015.

Honours
Member of the British Academy, 1972
Fellow of the British Academy, 1978
Distinguished Professor, Boston University, 1980
Honorary Student of Christ Church, Oxford, 1986
Knight Bachelor, 1987 New Year Honours
Fellow of the Royal Historical Society
Fellow of the Royal Society of Literature
Honorary Fellow of St Antony's College, Oxford, 1988
Honorary D Litt, Complutense University of Madrid, 1999
Award of Merit, Society for Spanish Historical Studies of the US, 1987
Leimer Award for Spanish Studies, University of Augsburg, 1990
Prince of Asturias Award in Social Sciences, Prince of Asturias Foundation, 1999
Grand Cross of the Order of Alfonso X el Sabio (Spain), 1983
Order of Infante Dom Henrique (Portugal), 1989
Foreign Member of the American Academy of Arts and Sciences, 2004

Clubs
Beefsteak and Oxford and Cambridge; sometime 

Selected worksTwo Swedish Financiers: Louis De Geer and Joel Gripenstierna, in H. E. Bell and R. L. Ollard, eds., Historical Essays Presented to David Ogg, London: Black, 1963Spain 1808–1939, Oxford University Press, 1966Latin American Affairs (ed.), Oxford University Press, 1970 (St Antony's Papers, no. 22)The Republic and the Civil War in Spain (ed.), 1971English Fox Hunting: A History, London: Weidenfeld & Nicolson, 1976, 2nd edition 1986, The Spanish Tragedy: the Civil War in Perspective, 1977Spain: Dictatorship to Democracy (with Juan Pablo Fusi), 1979Modern Spain: 1875-1980, 1980Spain 1808-1975, Oxford: Clarendon Press, 1982Fox-Hunting (with Sara Carr), Oxford University Press, 1982, Puerto Rico: a colonial experiment, 1984The Spanish Civil War: A History in Pictures (ed.), New York, W. W. Norton & Co., 1986The Chances of Death: a diary of the Spanish Civil War by Priscilla Scott-Ellis (ed. by Carr), 1995Visiones de fin de siglo, 1999Spain: A History (ed.), 2000El rostro cambiante de Clío (collection of pieces translated into Spanish by Eva Rodríguez Halffter), Madrid: Biblioteca Nueva, 2005 

Carr has also written many book reviews for journals, including the New York Review of Books and The Spectator''.

References

External links 

1919 births
Academics of King's College London
Alumni of Christ Church, Oxford
English knights
Fellows of All Souls College, Oxford
Fellows of New College, Oxford
Fellows of the British Academy
Fox hunters
Fox hunting writers
Historians of Latin America
Historians of Spain
Knights Bachelor
2015 deaths
British Hispanists
New York University faculty
Wardens of St Antony's College, Oxford
Fellows of the Royal Society of Literature
Fellows of the Royal Historical Society
English male non-fiction writers
20th-century English historians
People from Bath, Somerset
Historians of the Second Spanish Republic